Leslie Hamilton Begley (14 October 1916 – 24 August 1994) was  a former Australian rules footballer who played with Essendon in the Victorian Football League (VFL).

Footnotes

References
 
 World War Two Service Record: Lieutenant Leslie Hamilton Begley (VX115112), National Archives of Australia.
 Maplestone, M., Flying Higher: History of the Essendon Football Club 1872–1996, Essendon Football Club, (Melbourne), 1996.

External links 
 
 Les Begley's profile at Australianfootball.com
 Les Begley,. at Boyles Football Photos.

1916 births
1994 deaths
Australian rules footballers from Victoria (Australia)
Warrnambool Football Club players
Essendon Football Club players
Camperdown Football Club players
Australian Army personnel of World War II
Australian Army officers